Subud (pronounced ), acronym of Susila Budhi Dharma, is an international, interfaith spiritual movement that began in Indonesia in the 1920s, founded by Muhammad Subuh Sumohadiwidjojo (1901–1987). The basis of Subud is a spiritual exercise called the latihan kejiwaan, which Muhammad Subuh said represents guidance from "the Power of God" or "the Great Life Force."

He asserted that Subud was neither a new teaching nor a religion. Rather, Subuh remarked that as a result of following the inner guidance from the latihan, members could be guided towards a religion that was right for them, whether it is Christianity, Judaism, Islam, Hinduism, Buddhism, etc.  While following a religion can provide discipline that can be valuable for a member's inner development, it is not necessary to follow a religion in order to be in Subud and do the latihan.

There are Subud groups in about 83 countries, with a worldwide membership of about 10,000 in 2003.

Etymology
The name "Subud" is an acronym that stands for three Javanese words, Susila Budhi Dharma, which are derived from the Sanskrit terms suśīla (good-tempered), buddhi, and dharma.

The meaning depends on the context in which they are being used.  The original Sanskrit root words are defined differently than Pak Subuh indicates:

Sanskrit

Suśīla: "well-disposed", "having an amiable disposition", "good-tempered".
Buddhi: "intelligence, mind, reason".
Dharma: the Law that "upholds, supports or maintains the regulatory order of the universe".

Pak Subuh
Pak Subuh gives the following definitions:
 Susila: the good character of man in accordance with the Will of Almighty God.
 Budhi: the force of the inner self within man.
 Dharma: surrender, trust and sincerity towards Almighty God.

History

Muhammad Subuh Sumohadiwidjojo explained in talks to Subud members, beginning in the 1940s, that during 1925 he was taking a late-night walk when he had an unexpected and unusual experience. He said he found himself enveloped in a brilliant light, and looked up to see what seemed like the sun falling directly onto his body, and he thought that he was having a heart attack. He said he went directly home, lay down on his bed, and prepared to die with the feeling that maybe it was his time, and that he could not fight it, so he surrendered himself to God.

According to the story, however, instead of dying he was moved from within to stand up and perform movements similar to his normal Muslim prayer routine. It seemed that he was not moving through his own volition; but was being guided by what he interpreted as the power of God. This same kind of experience reportedly happened to him for a few hours each night over a period of about 1000 days during which he slept little but was able to continue working full-time. He said he experienced a kind of "inner teaching" whereby he was given to understand a variety of things spontaneously.

As these experiences proceeded, Pak Subuh explained, he gained spontaneous insight into people and situations that he had not possessed before. Around 1933, as he reported, he received that if other people were physically near him while he was in a state of "latihan", then the experience would begin in them also. While still in his early thirties, Pak Subuh's reputation as someone with spiritual insight apparently grew, and people went to him to be 'opened'. They in turn could open others, and this is how Subud eventually spread around the world.

In Jakarta, Husein Rofé, an English linguist who had been living in Indonesia since 1950, met Pak Subuh. Rofé had been searching for a spiritual path and became the first non-Indonesian to be opened.

Subud moved outside of Indonesia when Rofé attended a religious congress in Japan in 1954. Subud first spread internationally into Japan, followed by Hong Kong and Cyprus. In 1957, Rofé (who was then in London) suggested that Pak Subuh visit Britain. Pak Subuh accepted the invitation and visited the home of John G. Bennett in Coombe Springs. It was at this time that many UK followers of George Gurdjieff were initiated into Subud, including Bennett himself, though he later left the group. Over the next 14 months Pak Subuh visited many countries before returning to Indonesia.

Symbol

The Subud symbol was envisioned by Pak Subuh in 1959. The design consists of seven concentric circles and seven spokes, which, in traditional Javanese mysticism, represent seven levels of life forces as well as the Great Life Force that connects them. Each circle grows wider, the further out from the center, and each spoke narrows as it approaches the center. The space between the circles remains constant.

The symbol is often printed in black and white when color printing is not available. When colors are used, usually the circles and spokes are gold and the background is dark blue to black. However, the symbol is also sometimes blue on white or white on blue. The World Subud Association has registered this design, as well as the name "Subud", as a trade, service or collective membership mark in many countries.

Practices

The core of Subud is the latihan experience. Pak Subuh gives the following descriptions of Subud:

The central practice of Subud is the latihan kejiwaan (literally "spiritual exercise" or "training of the spirit") or simply "the latihan". This exercise is not thought about, learned or trained for; it is unique for each person and the ability to "receive" it is passed on by being in the presence of another practicing member at the "opening" (see below).  About twice a week, Subud members go to a local center to participate in a group latihan, men and women separately.  The experience takes place in a room or a hall with open space. After a period of sitting quietly, the members are typically asked to stand and relax by a "helper" (see below), who then announces the start of the exercise.

In the practice of the exercise, members are typically advised to follow "what arises from within", not expecting anything in advance. One is recommended not to focus on any image or recite any mantra, nor to mix the exercise with other activities like meditation or use of drugs, but simply to intend to surrender to the Divine or the transcendent good or the will of God. (The term "God" is used here with a broad and inclusive intention. An individual is at liberty to substitute interpretations that they feel more in tune with.) One is not to pay attention to others in the room, each of whom is doing his or her own latihan. During the exercise, practitioners may find that, in terms of physical and emotional expression, they involuntarily move, make sounds, walk around, dance, jump, skip, laugh, cry or whatever. The experience varies greatly for different people, but the practitioner is always wholly conscious throughout and free to stop the exercise at any time.

Many Subud members believe that this experience, apparently arising from within each person, provides them with something of what they currently need in life. For some, the latihan may appear to initially involve a "purification", which possibly permits subsequently deeper experience. Members may describe their latihan as leaving them feeling "cleansed", "centered", "at peace", or "energized". The latihan is sometimes said to "work" 24 hours a day, not only when one is explicitly "doing" it. Supposedly, the regular practice of the latihan will enable people to experience positive development in various aspects of their daily life and being. The official website talks of "a deepening of the natural connection with wisdom, one's higher self, the divine, or God, depending on one's preferred terminology". (see links)

Although the latihan can be practised alone, members are advised to participate regularly, ideally twice a week, in a group latihan. When a member has enough experience to reliably sense the appropriate time to finish his or her latihan session, he or she may add perhaps one more weekly session of the latihan at home.

While the suggestions of Subud's founder are held as valuable by many members, there is no requirement to believe anything, and the latihan is open to individuals of all faiths - or none. Subud officially endorses no doctrine regarding the latihan's nature or benefits.

The Opening
The "opening" refers to a person's first latihan, which is specially arranged to pass on the "contact", metaphorically resembling a candle flame that lights a new candle with no difference in quality of the flame. Only after the formal opening process, in most cases, is a person able to receive for himself or herself, and is then welcome to participate in the group latihan. In the opening, the person is accompanied by one or more experienced members called "helpers", and is asked to simply stand and relax with the helpers standing nearby. A simple statement or agreed set of "opening words" is read by one of the helpers that acknowledges the person's wish to receive the contact. The helpers then begin the exercise as they would normally do. The contact is passed on to the new member without effort or intention on the part of anyone present. This is the moment of the person's first connection with the latihan kejiwaan of Subud.

Testing
Testing is a distinct variety of the latihan directed toward receiving guidance or insight on a particular issue. Some question or request for clarification is acknowledged, and then the exercise is performed with openness to the issue. The original word for testing used by Muhammad Subuh was "terimah," which is Indonesian for "receiving". Many people who have been practicing the latihan for some time claim to be able to recognize indications or intuitions "from their inner feeling" in response to questions that are put forward.

Such indications may take various forms, including sounds, visions, vibrations and/or spontaneous physical movements similar to, though perhaps more intense than, those experienced in the usual latihan. However, it appears that such indications often defy intellectual analysis and that the supposed guidance can be obscured or biased by the mental or emotional attitudes of those present. Testing is generally viewed as an instrument for helping to clarify issues in the present, but may lead to confusion if treated as a kind of fortune-telling. Nevertheless, many Subud members claim to benefit from testing in terms of resolving issues.

Testing is normally used to help select helpers, and often committee members, throughout the World Subud Association. Pak Subuh's book "Susila Budhi Dharma" cites examples of situations in which testing may be useful, including self-training in putting any benefits of the latihan into practice. (Throughout Muhammad Subuh's book "Susila Budhi Dharma", which was written in 1952, testing is always referred to as "feeling" or "receiving". The first time "testing" was called by that name was in 1957 by John G. Bennett.)

Fasting
Individual Subud members often voluntarily engage in occasional fasting as Pak Subuh recommended. Each year, some members fast at the same time as the Muslim fast of Ramadan which Pak Subuh, himself a Muslim, claimed to be suitable for non-Muslims. Others fast during Lent or simply on a regular, private basis. In this context, fasting is regarded by many Subud members as spiritually edifying, although its practice is not expected.

Rules
Pak Subuh provided advice and guidance in his talks to provide direction to members as their latihan deepens. Although in general there are no rules in the practice of the latihan, non-members may not attend the latihan exercise without first receiving the contact referred to above, known as their opening.

Subud's founder wanted the latihan to be accessible to people of all cultures, faiths and ethnicities. Respect for the diversity of personal backgrounds and the uniqueness of each individual, along with a general absence of "thou shalt nots", are aspects of the organization that have been attractive to many members.

Association
Members who wish to take on organizational responsibility in Subud can volunteer as a committee member or as a helper. Each responsibility can be performed at the local, regional, national, and international levels. Members often move from one responsibility to another, as needed.

The broadest organizational responsibility rests with the World Subud Association, which organizes a World Congress every four years and consists of the Subud World Council, Subud representatives from each country, and individual members who wish to participate, although only representatives can vote. The headquarters of the international organization moves to a different country every four years.

Helpers

Each level of the association has members called "helpers" whose role is to coordinate the timing of group latihan, witness the opening of new members, speak to those interested in the latihan, be available to discuss problems relating to the latihan, and sometimes attend to the latihan needs of isolated or indisposed Subud members. Helpers are usually selected from members who are willing to perform the duties, and selection generally occurs through testing. In no way does selection mean that a person is more spiritually advanced than a member who is not a helper.

Helpers exist at the local, regional (in some countries), national and international levels. Helpers' geographical status relates to the regional or national supportive duties they are expected to provide – otherwise, there are no geographical restrictions on where a helper is considered to be a helper. A local helper from London who travels to Jakarta, for example, will be seen as a helper there, and can do testing or participate in a new member's opening in the same way as any Indonesian helper.

There are normally 18 international helpers—nine men and nine women. Three men and three women are assigned to each of the three areas in Subud:

 Area I covers Zones 1 & 2 (Australasia and Asia)
 Area II covers Zones 3, 4, 5, and 6 (Europe and Africa)
 Area III covers Zones 7, 8 & 9 (the Americas)

The international helpers are members of the World Subud Council. They serve on a voluntary basis for a four-year term, which runs from World Congress to World Congress. There is no distinction in rank between local, national, or international helpers. Nor is there a difference in status between helpers, committee or members. Being a helper is seen not as a talent but as a service role.

Ibu Rahayu
Ibu Siti Rahayu Wiryohudoyo is Pak Subuh's eldest daughter. In a talk given on 5 March 2010 to a National Gathering in Semarang, Indonesia, Ibu Siti Rahayu explains how she came to be appointed "spiritual advisor" by the Subud International Congress.

Committees
Most Subud groups have a committee, typically including a chairperson, vice-chair, treasurer and secretary. This committee is responsible for making sure there is a place to do group latihan, communications, budgets, and supporting the mutual efforts of members at the local group. A similar structure functions at the regional (in certain countries), national, zonal and international levels.

The international executive is the International Subud Committee (ISC). Apart from ensuring communication, publishing, budgeting, archives and support of affiliates, it organizes a World Congress every four years. The ISC chairperson sits on the World Subud Council.

For purposes of a practical organizational structure, the Subud association is divided into nine multinational zones, more or less as follows:

Zones 1 & 2 – Australasia and Asia
Zone 3 – includes 8 countries of western Europe
Zone 4 – central and eastern European countries
Zones 5 & 6 – Francophone and Anglophone African countries, respectively
Zone 7 – USA, Canada, Mexico, Cuba, Jamaica, Surinam, and the Caribbean
Zone 8 – the upper part of South America
Zone 9 – the lower part of South America

Each Zone has its own four representatives that are the voting members on the World Subud Council. They also serve as volunteers a four-year term like helpers. They are selected at Zone Meetings.

The chairperson of the World Subud Association serves a four-year term from one World Congress to the next and is also the chairperson of the World Subud Council. The World Subud Council is responsible for ensuring that decisions made at World Congress are carried through.

Affiliates
Subud affiliates (sometimes called ‘wings’) are subsidiary organizations that focus on specific projects at a national or international level. They are technically independent organizations but have overlapping boards of trustees. They include:

Susila Dharma International Association (SDI or SDIA) – humanitarian projects
Subud International Cultural Association (SICA) – networking cultural activities
Subud Enterprise Services International (SES or SESI) – networks between entrepreneurial activities
Subud Youth Association (SYA) – networks among younger Subud members
Subud International Health Organisation (SIHA) – incorporates both scientific and alternative approaches

Some chairpersons of these affiliates also sit on the World Subud Council and serve a four-year term.

In addition to the above affiliates, a foundation – the Muhammad Subuh Foundation (MSF) – has been set up, whose main work is helping groups acquire their own latihan premises.

Informal networks and interest groups initiated by members include a Peace Network, a Spiritual Support Network (Yahoo group) and several Facebook groups.

Enterprises
When Subud first spread outside Indonesia, Pak Subuh talked mainly about the spiritual exercise. He started to encourage Subud members to engage in enterprises and donate a proportion of profits to welfare projects and to maintaining the Subud organisation. He explained that the fact of the latihan "bringing to life" the physical body indicates that worship need not be viewed as narrowly as prayer in places of worship; that people's ordinary lives, when following and guided by the Power of God, are ongoing worship, such that there is a dynamic interplay between "material" life and "spiritual" life. Therefore, his encouragement for Subud members to engage in enterprise is seen in the context of putting the latihan into practice.

Membership
Membership is open to any person over 17 years of age, irrespective of the person's religion or lack of religion. (As Pak Subuh saw it, the latihan is for "all of mankind.") The exception is that someone suffering from a serious mental illness may not be initiated as a member.

There is normally a waiting period of up to three months before a person may be opened. During this period, the enquirer is expected to meet a few times with the local helpers so that he or she can have questions answered and doubts clarified.

There is no membership fee, but most Subud members contribute, for example, to the rent or upkeep of premises where they meet.

Notes

References

Bibliography

 
 
 
 Mulder, Niels Mysticism & everyday life in contemporary Java : cultural persistence and change Singapore : Singapore University Press, 1978.

Primary sources
 
 Sumohadiwidjojo, M. S. "Autobiography" , Subud Publications International (March 1990)
 The International Helpers, "On the Subud Way" , (c) The World Subud Association (WSA) 2005

External links 
 

 Subud Vision Site publishing critiques of Subud.

 
1925 introductions
Javanese spiritual movements
New religious movements
Religious organizations established in 1925
Spirituality